Big Creek is a  long creek in Kentucky, United States whose headwaters are in Leslie County and that flows into the Red Bird River in Clay County.
A postoffice and village are named for it.
Its own name is likely purely descriptive of its frequent flooding and high water levels, as it is not otherwise one of the biggest tributaries of Red Bird River.

The post office named after it was established by James Marcum on 1871-01-10.
Originally located one mile up from the Red Bird River, it has moved several times up and down the creek, and as of 2000 was located three quarters of a mile up from the Red Bird, serving the Big Creek village.
Big Creek postoffice has ZIP code 40914.

In Leslie County the creek has tributaries Hals Fork (which U.S. 421 parallels), Couch Fork (paralleled by the Parkway), Hollins Fork, Bear Branch ( long), and Ulysses Creek.
Couch Fork used to be named Collins Fork, and the Obed postoffice, founded on 1903-01-26 by postmaster Levi Couch, used to lie between Collins and Hollins Forks.
Obed was in 1936 moved downhill to the Twin Branch tributary of Collins/Couch Fork and closed in 1938.

A Bear Branch postoffice was established by William Britton on 1923-11-10, named after the branch.
It moved again when U.S. 421 was built, to a point next to the highway, and a further time in 1936 to its present location just below the branch  from the Clay county line.

A Jason postoffice was established by postmaster Billie Jones to serve Hollins Fork on 1937-01-09.
The postmaster's original choice of name, Elim, was disregarded because of potential confusion with an Elem postoffice in Rockcastle County.

Cross-reference

Sources

Further reading

 

Unincorporated communities in Clay County, Kentucky
Unincorporated communities in Leslie County, Kentucky
Unincorporated communities in Kentucky